Önder is a Turkish given name for males with the meaning “leader“. People named Önder include:

 Önder Atakanlı, Turkish actor
 Önder Çengel, Turkish-Swiss footballer
 Önder Sisters, Ferhan Önder and Ferzan Önder, Turkish twin sister classical pianists
 Önder Şipal, Turkish boxer
 Önder Turacı, Turkish footballer 
 Fazıl Önder, Turkish Cypriot journalist
 Önder Gürcan, Turkish researcher

Turkish-language surnames
Turkish masculine given names